Macradenia lutescens is a species of epiphytic orchid known by the common name longgland orchid. It is native to South America (Brazil, Peru, Ecuador, Colombia, Venezuela, the Guianas), the West Indies (Trinidad, Cuba, Hispaniola, Jamaica, Bahamas), and southern Florida (Miami-Dade County).

References

External links 
 
 
 IOSPE orchid photos, Macradenia lutescens, Photo courtesy of Patricia Harding

lutescens
Orchids of Florida
Orchids of South America
Flora of the Caribbean
Plants described in 1822
Flora without expected TNC conservation status